Panuga Riou (born 13 March 1992) is an English badminton player. She started playing badminton at age 10, and in 2012 she became the finalist of the Polish International tournament. She earned a Sport and Social Science degree at the University of Bath.

Achievements

BWF International Challenge/Series 
Women's singles

  BWF International Challenge tournament
  BWF International Series tournament
  BWF Future Series tournament

References

External links 
 

1992 births
Living people
Panuga Riou
English people of Thai descent
English female badminton players